Just Between Us is the debut album by jazz guitarist Norman Brown released in 1992 by Motown Records. The album reached No. 4 on the Billboard Top Contemporary Jazz Albums chart.

Background
Brown produced the album with guest appearances by Stevie Wonder, Kirk Whalum, Ronnie Laws, the Earth, Wind & Fire Horns and Boyz II Men. The album contains cover versions of two songs: "Love Holiday" by Earth, Wind & Fire and "Too High" by Stevie Wonder. The latter song was featured in the end credits of the film Passenger 57.

Track listing

Personnel
 Norman Brown – guitar
 Raymond Brown – trumpet
 Reginald Young – trombone
 Ronnie Laws – soprano saxophone
 Gerald Albright – tenor saxophone
 Kirk Whalum – tenor saxophone
 Gary Bias – saxophone, flute
 Jeff Clayton – saxophone, flute
 Nathan East – bass
 Richard Patterson – bass
 Sam Sims – bass
 Verdine White – bass
 Brian Simpson – keyboards
 Herman Jackson – keyboards
 Wayne Linsey – keyboards
 Bobby Lyle – piano
 Al McKay – guitar
 Mike Baker – drums
 Chuck Morris – drums
 Paulinho da Costa – percussion
 Munyungo Jackson – percussion
 Land Richards – cymbal
 Boyz II Men – backing vocals
 Stevie Wonder – vocals, harmonica

References

1992 debut albums
Norman Brown (guitarist) albums
Motown albums